Giovanni Vincenzo Cardinal Bonzano PIME (27 September 1867 – 26 November 1927) was an Italian Cardinal of the Roman Catholic Church who served as Apostolic Delegate to United States from 1912 to 1922, and was elevated to the cardinalate in 1922.

Biography
Giovanni Bonzano was born in Castelletto Monferrato to Giuseppe and Agostina (née Vescovo) Bonzano. He attended the seminary in Vigevano before going to Rome to study at the Mastai College for Chinese Missions and Pontifical Urbanian Athenaeum De Propaganda Fide. He was ordained a priest of the Pontifical Institute for Foreign Missions by Cardinal Lucido Parocchi on 21 May 1890, and then did missionary work in China until 1897. Upon returning to Italy, Bonzano was made vicar general (26 August 1899) and chancellor (10 February 1900) of Vigevano. He then taught at the Pontifical Urbanian Athenaeum De Propaganda Fide from 1901 to 1904, becoming its rector on 16 May.

On 2 February 1912, Bonzano was appointed Apostolic Delegate to United States and Titular Archbishop of Melitene by Pope Pius X. He received his episcopal consecration on the following 3 March from Cardinal Rafael Merry del Val, with Bishops Pietro Barruti and Thomas Kennedy serving as co-consecrators, in Rome. Bonzano, in addition to his duties in Washington, D.C., was temporarily placed in charge of the Apostolic Delegation to Mexico on 22 June 1915.

Pope Pius XI created him Cardinal-Priest of San Pancrazio in the consistory of 11 December 1922, whereupon he ceased to serve as Apostolic Delegate. Cardinal Bonzano opted to assume the titular church of Santa Susanna on 18 December 1924, and later presided over the initial renovation of the Basilica of Santa Maria degli Angeli in Assisi on 19 April 1925. He also served as papal legate to the 28th International Eucharistic Congress in Chicago on 20–24 June 1926. He arrived at the Congress aboard the "Cardinal's Train", a special New York Central/Pullman train painted cardinal red and gold to carry Bonzano and several other cardinals from the port in New York to Chicago.

Cardinal Bonzano died in Rome, at age 60. He is buried in the church of the Franciscan Missionaries of Mary in Grottaferrata.

References

External links

Catholic-Hierarchy 

Cardinal Bonzano's New York Central/Pullman Train to the 28th International Eucharistic Congress in Chicago in 1926

1867 births
1927 deaths
20th-century Italian cardinals
Apostolic Nuncios to the United States
Cardinals created by Pope Pius XI
People from the Province of Alessandria
Rectors of the Pontificio Collegio Urbano de Propaganda Fide